Marchbank is an English surname. Notable people with the surname include:

Bill Marchbank (1887–1941), Australian rules footballer
Brian Marchbank (born 1958), Scottish golfer
Caleb Marchbank (born 1996), Australian rules footballer
Jim Marchbank (1878–1959), Australian rules footballer
John Marchbank (1883–1946), Scottish trade unionist
Peter Marchbank, British conductor
Walter Marchbank (1838–1893), English cricketer

English-language surnames